SMS Rheinland was one of four s, the first dreadnoughts built for the German Imperial Navy (Kaiserliche Marine). Rheinland mounted twelve  main guns in six twin turrets in an unusual hexagonal arrangement. The navy built Rheinland and her sister ships in response to the revolutionary British , which had been launched in 1906. Rheinland was laid down in June 1907, launched the following year in October, and commissioned in April 1910.

Rheinlands extensive service with the High Seas Fleet during World War I included several fleet advances into the North Sea, some in support of raids against the English coast conducted by the German battlecruisers of I Scouting Group. These sorties culminated in the Battle of Jutland on 31 May – 1 June 1916, in which Rheinland was heavily engaged by British destroyers in close-range night fighting.

The ship also saw duty in the Baltic Sea, as part of the support force for the Battle of the Gulf of Riga in 1915. She returned to the Baltic as the core of an expeditionary force to aid the White Finns in the Finnish Civil War in 1918, but ran aground shortly after arriving in the area. Significant portions of her armor and all her main guns had to be removed before she could be refloated. The damage done by the grounding was deemed too severe to justify repairs and Rheinland was decommissioned to be used as a barracks ship for the remainder of the war. In 1919, following the scuttling of the German fleet in Scapa Flow, Rheinland was ceded to the Allies who, in turn, sold the vessel to ship-breakers in the Netherlands. The ship was eventually broken up for scrap metal starting in 1920. Her bell is on display at the Military History Museum of the Bundeswehr in Dresden.

Description 

German designers initially considered ships equipped with  secondary guns, but erroneous reports in early 1904 that the British s would be equipped with a secondary battery of  guns prompted them to consider an even more powerful ship armed with an all-big-gun armament consisting of eight  guns. Over the next two years, the design was refined into a larger vessel with twelve of the guns, by which time Britain had launched the all-big-gun battleship .

She displaced  with a normal load, and  fully laden. She retained 3-shaft triple expansion engines instead of more advanced turbine engines. Steam for the engines was provided by twelve coal-fired water-tube boilers. This type of machinery was chosen at the request of both Admiral Alfred von Tirpitz and the Navy's construction department; the latter stated in 1905 that the "use of turbines in heavy warships does not recommend itself." This decision was based solely on cost: at the time, Parsons held a monopoly on steam turbines and required a 1 million gold mark royalty fee for every turbine engine. German firms were not ready to begin production of turbines on a large scale until 1910.

Rheinland carried a main battery of twelve  SK L/45 guns in an unusual hexagonal configuration. Her secondary armament consisted of twelve  SK L/45 guns and sixteen  SK L/45 guns, all of which were mounted in casemates. The ship was also armed with six  submerged torpedo tubes. One tube was mounted in the bow, another in the stern, and two on each broadside, on both ends of the torpedo bulkheads.

Commanding officers 
Rheinland was initially commanded by Kapitän zur See (KzS) Albert Hopman, from her commissioning until August 1910. He was temporarily replaced by Korvettenkapitän Wilhelm Bunnemann when the ship's crew was reduced to commission the battlecruiser  in September 1910. Hopman returned to the ship later that month, and held command through September 1911. KzS Richard Engel replaced Hopman in 1911 and commanded the ship until August 1915. That month, he left the ship and KzS Heinrich Rohardt was given command of Rheinland. He served for over a year, until December 1916, when he was replaced by Korvettenkapitän Theodor von Gorrissen. Gorrissen's command lasted until September 1918; he was replaced by KzS Ernst Toussaint, who held command of the ship for less than a month. Fregattenkapitän Friedrich Berger was the ship's last commander, serving from September 1918 until the ship's decommissioning on 4 October.

Service history 

Rheinland was ordered under the provisional name Ersatz Württemberg, as a replacement for the old  . She was laid down on 1 June 1907 at the AG Vulcan shipyard in Stettin. Like her sister , construction proceeded under absolute secrecy; detachments of soldiers guarded the shipyard itself, as well as contractors such as Krupp that supplied building materials. The ship was launched on 26 September 1908; at the launching ceremony the ship was christened by Queen Elisabeth of Romania and Clemens Freiherr von Schorlemer-Lieser gave a speech. Fitting-out work was completed by the end of February 1910. A dockyard crew was used for limited sea trials, which lasted from 23 February to 4 March 1910 off Swinemünde. She was then taken to Kiel, where she was commissioned into the High Seas Fleet on 30 April 1910. More sea trials followed in the Baltic Sea.

At the conclusion of trials on 30 August 1910, Rheinland was taken to Wilhelmshaven, where a significant portion of the crew was transferred to the new battlecruiser Von der Tann. Following the autumn fleet maneuvers in September, the crew was replenished with crewmembers from the old pre-dreadnought battleship , which was decommissioned at the same time. Rheinland was then assigned to I Battle Squadron of the High Seas Fleet. In October, the fleet went on the annual winter cruise, followed by fleet exercises in November. The ship took part in the summer cruises to Norway each August in 1911, 1913, and 1914.

World War I 
Rheinland participated in nearly all of the fleet advances throughout the war. The first such operation was conducted primarily by the battlecruisers; the ships bombarded Scarborough, Hartlepool, and Whitby on 15–16 December 1914. During the operation, the German battle fleet of some 12 dreadnoughts and 8 pre-dreadnoughts, which was serving as distant support for the battlecruisers, came to within  of an isolated squadron of six British battleships. However, skirmishes between the rival destroyer screens convinced the German commander, Admiral Friedrich von Ingenohl, that he was confronted with the entire Grand Fleet. He broke off the engagement and turned for home. A fleet sortie to the Dogger Bank took place on 24 April 1915. During the operation, the high-pressure cylinder of Rheinlands starboard engine failed. Repair work lasted until 23 May.

Battle of the Gulf of Riga 

In August 1915, the German fleet attempted to clear the Russian-held Gulf of Riga in order to facilitate the capture of Riga by the German army. To do so, the German planners intended to drive off or destroy the Russian naval forces in the Gulf, which included the pre-dreadnought battleship  and a number of gunboats and destroyers. The German naval force would also lay a series of minefields in the northern entrance to the Gulf to prevent Russian naval reinforcements from reentering the area. The force operated under the command of Vice Admiral Franz von Hipper. The eight battleships were to provide cover for the forces engaging the Russian flotilla. The first attempt on 8 August was unsuccessful, as it had taken too long to clear the Russian minefields to allow the minelayer  to lay a minefield of her own.

On the first day of the assault, the German minesweeper  was sunk, as was the destroyer . The following day, Nassau and Posen engaged in an artillery duel with Slava, resulting in three hits on the Russian ship that forced her to retreat. By 19 August, the Russian minefields had been cleared and the flotilla entered the Gulf. However, reports of Allied submarines in the area prompted the Germans to call off the operation the following day. Admiral Hipper later remarked that "To keep valuable ships for a considerable time in a limited area in which enemy submarines were increasingly active, with the corresponding risk of damage and loss, was to indulge in a gamble out of all proportion to the advantage to be derived from the occupation of the Gulf before the capture of Riga from the land side."

Return to the North Sea 
By the end of August, Rheinland and the rest of the High Seas Fleet units were back in their bases on the North Sea. The next operation conducted was a sweep into the North Sea on 11–12 September, though it ended without any action. Another sortie followed on 23–24 October during which the German fleet did not encounter any British forces. On 12 February 1916, Rheinland was sent to the dockyard for an extensive overhaul, which lasted until 19 April. Rheinland was back with the fleet in time to participate in another advance into the North Sea on 21–22 April. Another bombardment mission followed two days later; Rheinland was part of the battleship support for the I Scouting Group battlecruisers that attacked Yarmouth and Lowestoft on 24–25 April. During this operation, the battlecruiser Seydlitz was damaged by a British mine and had to return to port prematurely. Visibility was poor, so the operation was quickly called off before the British fleet could intervene.

Battle of Jutland 

Admiral Reinhard Scheer immediately planned another attack on the British coast, but the damage to Seydlitz and condenser trouble on several of the III Battle Squadron dreadnoughts delayed the plan until the end of May. The German battlefleet departed the Jade at 03:30 on 31 May. Rheinland was assigned to II Division of I Battle Squadron, under the command of Rear Admiral W. Engelhardt. II Division was the last unit of dreadnoughts in the fleet; they were followed by the elderly pre-dreadnoughts of II Battle Squadron.

Between 17:48 and 17:52, 11 German dreadnoughts, including Rheinland, engaged and opened fire on the British 2nd Light Cruiser Squadron, though the range and poor visibility prevented effective fire, which was soon checked. Some ten minutes later Rheinland again opened fire on the British cruisers, targeting what was most likely , though without success. By 20:15, the German fleet had faced the deployed Grand Fleet for a second time and was forced to turn away; in doing so, the order of the German line was reversed, with Rheinland third from the front, behind Westfalen and Nassau. At 21:22, crewmen aboard Rheinland and Westfalen, the two leading ships in the German line, spotted two torpedo tracks that turned out to be imaginary. The ships were then forced to slow down in order to allow the battlecruisers of I Scouting Group to pass ahead. Around 22:00, Rheinland and Westfalen observed unidentified light forces in the gathering darkness. After flashing a challenge via searchlight that was ignored, the two ships turned away to starboard in order to evade any torpedoes that might have been fired. The rest of I Battle Squadron followed them.

At about 00:30, the leading units of the German line encountered British destroyers and cruisers. After a few minutes, Rheinland and the rest of the German battleships turned away to avoid torpedoes. At 00:36, Rheinland was hit by a pair of  shells from Black Prince. One of the shells cut the cables to the four forward searchlights and damaged the forward funnel. The second struck the side of the ship and exploded on the forward armored transverse bulkhead. Although the bulkhead was bent inward from the explosion, it was not penetrated. About 45 minutes later, Rheinland opened fire on another destroyer, possibly , but she had to cease when a German cruiser came too close to the line of fire. At the same time, Black Prince was obliterated by accurate fire from the battleship .

Despite the ferocity of the night fighting, the High Seas Fleet punched through the British destroyer forces and reached Horns Reef by 04:00 on 1 June. The German fleet reached Wilhelmshaven a few hours later, where Rheinland refueled and re-armed. Meanwhile, her three sisters stood out in the roadstead in defensive positions. Over the course of the battle, the ship had fired thirty-five 28 cm (11 in) shells and twenty-six 15 cm (5.9 in) rounds. The two hits from Black Prince had killed 10 men and wounded 20. Repair work followed immediately in Wilhelmshaven and was completed by 10 June.

Later actions 
Another fleet advance followed on 18–22 August; the I Scouting Group battlecruisers were to bombard the coastal town of Sunderland in an attempt to draw out and destroy Beatty's battlecruisers. Rheinland and the rest of the High Seas Fleet were to trail behind and provide cover. The British were aware of the German plans and sortied the Grand Fleet to meet them. By 14:35, Admiral Scheer had been warned of the Grand Fleet's approach and, unwilling to engage the whole of the Grand Fleet just 11 weeks after the decidedly close call at Jutland, turned his forces around and retreated to German ports.

Rheinland covered a sweep by torpedo boats into the North Sea on 25–26 September. She then participated in a fleet advance on 18–20 October. In early 1917, the ship was stationed on sentry duty in the German Bight. The crew became unruly due to poor quality food in July and August of that year. The ship did not take part directly in Operation Albion against the Russians, but remained in the western Baltic to prevent a possible incursion by the British to support their Russian ally.

Expedition to Finland 

On 22 February 1918, Rheinland and her sister Westfalen were tasked with a mission to Finland to support German army units to be deployed there. The ship arrived in Åland on 6 March, where her commander became the Senior Naval Commander, a position he held until 10 April. On 11 April, the ship departed the Ålands for Helsinki, with the intention of proceeding to Danzig to refuel. However, she encountered heavy fog while en route and ran aground on Lagskär Island at 07:30. Two men were killed in the incident and the ship was badly damaged. Three boiler rooms were flooded and the inner hull was pierced. Refloating efforts on 18–20 April proved unsuccessful. The crew was removed temporarily, to bring the pre-dreadnought  back into service. On 8 May, a floating crane was brought in from Danzig; the main guns, some of the turret armor, and the bow and citadel armor were all removed. The ship was lightened by —more than a third of her normal displacement—and with the aid of pontoons, eventually refloated by 9 July. The ship was towed to Mariehamn where some limited repairs were effected. On 24 July the ship departed for Kiel with the assistance of two tug boats; she arrived there three days later. It was determined that repair work was impractical and instead the ship was decommissioned on 4 October and placed into service as a barracks ship in Kiel.

Fate 
Following the German collapse in November 1918, a significant portion of the High Seas Fleet was interned in Scapa Flow according to the terms of the Armistice. Rheinland and her three sisters were not among the ships listed for internment, so they remained in German ports. However, a copy of The Times informed von Reuter that the Armistice was to expire at noon on 21 June 1919, the deadline by which Germany was to have signed the peace treaty. Rear Admiral von Reuter came to the conclusion that the British intended to seize the German ships after the Armistice expired. To prevent this, he decided to scuttle his ships at the first opportunity. On the morning of 21 June, the British fleet left Scapa Flow to conduct training maneuvers; at 11:20 Reuter transmitted the order to his ships.

As a result of the scuttling at Scapa Flow, the Allies demanded replacements for the ships that had been sunk. This included Rheinland, which was struck from the German naval list on 5 November 1919 and subsequently handed over to the Allies. The ship was sold on 28 June 1920 to ship-breakers in Dordrecht in the Netherlands, under the contract name "F". She was towed there a month later on 29 July and broken up by the end of the following year. Rheinlands bell is preserved at the Military History Museum of the Bundeswehr in Dresden.

Notes

Footnotes

Citations

References

Further reading

Nassau-class battleships
Ships built in Stettin
World War I battleships of Germany
1908 ships
Maritime incidents in 1918